This is a List of Greek subdivisions by their GDP, or gross domestic product. There are fourteen modern regions of Greece, instituted in 1987. Greece's overall GDP was $281 billion in 2012, which represents $24,505 per capita, 44th in the world.

Regions

See also
 Economy of Greece

References

GDP
Greece
Greece